Stojan is a masculine given name of Slavic origin.

Notable people with the name include:

Stojan Gjuroski (born 1991), basketball player
Stojan Andov (born 1935), politician
Stojan Aralica (1883–1980), painter
Stojan Čupić (1765–1815), military leader
Stojan Ignatov (born 1979), footballer
Stojan Janković (1636–1687), military leader
Stojan Lukić (born 1979), football goalkeeper
Stojan Novaković (1842–1915), scholar and politician
Stojan Pilipović (born 1987), footballer
Stojan Protić (1857–1923), politician
Stojan Vranješ (born 1986), footballer

See also
Stoyan
 Stoyanov, Stoyko, Stoykov from the same root, in Bulgarian
Stojanov
Stojanović

Slavic masculine given names
Serbian masculine given names